Torreblanca is a municipality in the province of Castellón, Valencian Community, Spain. The town is  located south of the Serra d'Irta mountain range close to the Mediterranean Sea.

Torreblanca is located 36 km ENE of the town of Castellón de la Plana, on the Costa del Azahar.

History
Torreblanca was conquered from the Saracens by James I of Aragon in the 13th century and repopulated. In 1379 Torreblanca was raided by Barbary corsairs and the town was razed to the ground. Torreblanca was again the scenario of violent battles during the Carlist Wars in the 19th century.
There are wetlands by the sea close to the town and there were cases of malaria in the surrounding area until the mid-20th century, when malaria was finally eradicated.

Nowadays Torreblanca's economy is based on seasonal tourism. Platja de Torrenostra and Platja Nord, the two beaches within its municipal term, are relatively unspoilt and quite popular in the summer.

Villages
Torreblanca
Torrenostra

Business
Acesur

Notable people
Joan Barreda

References

External links

 Ajuntament de Torreblanca
 Oficina de Turisme
 Institut Valencià d'Estadística
 Portal de la Direcció General d'Administració Local de la Generalitat

Plana Alta
Municipalities in the Province of Castellón